Talk to the Sea is a 2014 compilation album by Italian ambient musician Gigi Masin. It features both released and unreleased material, spanning from 1985 to 2010.

Background and release

Masin self-released the album Wind on his own The Bear on the Moon label in 1986, to very little acclaim or popularity. After the release of the album The Wind Collector in 1991, Masin stopped making music following disappointment with the music scene. Wind later became a sought-after record by crate diggers.

Jamie Tiller of the reissue label Music from Memory discovered Masin's 1986 album Wind while researching Italian electronic music. Tiller got in contact with Masin and received "some 80 tracks", which spanned from the early 80s until recently. Tiller, along with label co-founders Abel Nagengast and Tako Reyenga, spent "literally months" compiling the album from the archival material.

The release of the compilation resulted in a resurgence of Masin's career, which had been stagnant for most of the '90s and '00s. Following the release, Masin started touring internationally and releasing new music after increased interest in his work.

The compilation was later released on CD with six additional tracks; one from Wind and the rest unreleased.

Reception

Paul Simpson of AllMusic gave the album 3 stars. Simpson praised "Masin's serene, sparse, slowly paced compositions", but noted that the 23 tracks on the CD makes for a "somewhat tiring two-hour listen."

Track listing

Vinyl

CD

Personnel
Per liner notes.
Musicians
 Gigi Masin — vocals on "Snake Theory" and "Call Me"; piano on "Snake Theory", "The Word Love", "Fata Morgana", "Nadir", "Stella Maris", "Call Me" and "She Wear Shades"; electric piano on "The Kasparian Circle"; synthesizer on "Snake Theory", "The Word Love", "Still", "Fata Morgana", "Redanzen", "Talk to the Sea", "Music for Chameleons", "Little Faith", "The Nylon Dollar", "The Kasparian Circle", "Stella Maris", "Call Me", "The City Lights" and "Almanac"; guitar on "Still", "Music for Chameleons" and "First Time Ruth Saw the Sea"; bowed guitar on "Call Me"; vibraphone on "Redanzen", "The Nylon Dollar" and "The City Lights"; drums on "Fata Morgana", "Little Faith" and "The Nylon Dollar"; tubular bells on "Talk to the Sea"; trumpet on "Little Faith" and "The Kasparian Circle"; zither on "She Wears Shades"; radio voices on "The Word Love"
 Allessandro Monti — vocals on "Call Me" and "Almanac"; bass on "Snake Theory", "Stella Maris" and "Call Me"; piano on "She Wears Shades"
 Alessandro Pizzin — keyboards on "Snake Theory", "Stella Maris", "She Wears Shades" and "Almanac"
 Massimo Berrizzi — trumpet on "Still"
Production
 Gigi Masin — recording engineer and producer on "The Word Love", "Still", "Fata Morgana", "Redanzen", "Talk to the Sea", "Music for Chameleons", "Little Faith", "The Nylon Dollar", "The Kasparian Circle", "Nadir", "The City Lights"; producer on "Call Me"
 Alessandro Pizzin — recording engineer, producer on "Snake Theory", "First Time Ruth Saw the Sea", "Stella Maris", "She Wears Shades", "Almanac"
 Ermanno Velludo — recording engineer on "Call Me"
 Abel Nagengast — compiler
 Tako Reyenga — compiler
 Jamie Tiller — compiler, sleeve photography
 Brandenburg Mastering — mastering engineer
 Commission — design

References

External links
 
 

2014 compilation albums
Music from Memory albums
Ambient compilation albums